The 1892–93 Rugby Union County Championship was the fifth edition of England's premier rugby union club competition at the time.

Yorkshire won the competition for the fourth time, defeating all three teams in the Championship Series.

Draw and Results

Group Winners

Championship Series

Decisive tie

See also
 English rugby union system
 Rugby union in England

References

Rugby Union County Championship
County Championship (rugby union) seasons